With the introduction of the marine propeller back in the early 19th century, cavitation during operation has always been a limiting factor on efficiency of ships. Cavitation in marine propellers develops when the propeller operates at a high speed and reduces its efficiency. Ever since the introduction of the propeller, solutions for cavitation have been developed and tested.

Nozzle System 
As the name suggests, this system uses a set of nozzles to help reduce and prevent the likelihood of cavitation in propellers. This system was developed by Samsung Shipping which is based in South Korea. In order to reduce the possibility of cavitation happening in marine propellers, a set of nozzles are placed on the hull of the ship directly in front of the propeller. These nozzles spray out compressed air over the propeller that creates “a macro bubble”. This bubble completely encompasses the propeller that is in operation. With the differing characteristics of the seawater outside of the bubble and the air inside, a zone develops that has the ability to reduce the “resonance frequency”. Due to this reduction, cavitation is less likely to occur during operation of a marine propeller.

To determine how effective this nozzle system could be, multiple tests were carried out with the nozzles and without them. In these tests, it was discovered that the resonance frequencies and the likelihood of cavitation could be reduced by up to 75%. Those who conducted these tests also tried two different arrangements of the nozzles to find out which one was more effective. The first arrangement used only one nozzle, which though it used considerably less power than the other option, it was not nearly as successful. The multi-nozzle system, on the other hand, gave much better results but required more power to operate.

While this nozzle system has major drawbacks particularly in its power requirements, the possibility of cavitation in the operation of marine propellers is reduced considerably. Thus, to some ship owners and operators, the cost of installing these nozzles and operating them is outweighed by the benefits of increased efficiency in their propellers.

Air-Filled Rubber Membrane 
The Air-Filled Rubber Membrane uses the same principles as the Nozzle System to reduce cavitation in marine propellers. Since the Nozzle System requires a large source of energy to operate, the creators sought to create a system that has the same results but is cheaper to operate. This membrane builds on the lessons learned in designing the Nozzle System and uses a pocket of air to prevent cavitation but does not require nozzles or compressors. While at the same time limiting the cost of operation, this membrane provides just as much protection against cavitation as the nozzles do.

The Air-Filled Rubber Membrane is placed directly behind an operating marine propeller in the hull. As described before, the differing characteristics of the air in the membrane and the seawater around it reduce the resonance frequency, which in turn increases the point at which cavitation is encountered. The membrane is specially designed which, along with the use of rubber, furthers the effect of reducing the frequency. This membrane is cheaper to operate than the Propeller Control System+ and the Nozzle System but is not as effective as the PCS+ in reducing cavitation.

Different Materials for Propellers 
This solution focuses on the materials that marine propellers are created from which is a direct factor in cavitation. While redesigning propellers would only garner an extra one or two percent efficiency in operation, changing the materials a propeller is made from has greater effects. The most common blend that marine propellers are created from is the nickel aluminum bronze blend. While this blend can resist erosion which is why it is so common, it cannot properly handle cavitation.

However, this is beginning to change. The Royal Netherlands Navy for one is starting to experiment with composite materials like resins or carbon fiber. These materials, when formed into a propeller, are flexible enough under pressure to “deflect,” which can reduce cavitation. Other  options are made from carbon fiber, epoxy resin, or even glass, and are able to produce “a hydro elastic effect”. Since these new propellers can flex and are not nearly as rigid under pressure, the risk of cavitation is reduced.

While replacing propellers would be the most efficient on ships that are currently under construction, the benefits from newer propeller materials could outweigh costs of replacing current marine propellers. Despite the initial cost of the propellers, this solution costs nothing to operate making it more feasible to shipping around the globe.

References 

Marine engineering
Marine propulsion